Slick is the surname of:

China Kantner (aka China Slick Kantner; born 1971), American actor and VJ; daughter of Grace Slick
Darby Slick (born 1944), American guitarist and songwriter; brother-in-law to Grace Slick
Duane Slick (born 1961) American Meskwaki artist and educator
Earl Slick (born 1952), American guitarist and songwriter
Eric Slick (born 1987), American singer, songwriter, and drummer
Grace Slick (born 1939), American singer and songwriter; sister-in-law to Darby Slick
Jonathan Slick (pseudonym of Ann S. Stephens; 1810–1886), American novelist and editor
Matt Slick (born ?), American Christian apologist, anti-cultist, and website founder [see: Christian Apologetics and Research Ministry]
Mitchy Slick (born 1973), American rapper and music executive
Stephen Slick (born ?), American government official and clinical professor
Thomas Baker Slick Sr. (1883–1930), American oil prospector
Thomas Whitten Slick (1869–1959), American lawyer and judge
Tom Slick (1916–1962), American inventor, businessman, adventurer; son of Thomas Baker Slick Sr.

See also
Slick (nickname)